John Deere (February 7, 1804 – May 17, 1886) was an American blacksmith and manufacturer who founded Deere & Company, one of the largest and leading agricultural and construction-equipment manufacturers in the world. Born in Rutland, Vermont, Deere moved to Illinois and invented the first commercially successful steel plow in 1837.

Early life
John Deere was born on February 7, 1804, in Rutland, Vermont. After a brief educational period at Middlebury College, at age 17 in 1821, he began an apprenticeship with Captain Benjamin Lawrence, a successful Middlebury blacksmith, and entered the trade for himself in 1826. He married Demarius Lamb in 1827 and fathered nine children.  Deere worked in Burlington before opening his own shops, first in Vergennes, and then in Leicester.

Steel plow
John Deere settled in Grand Detour, Illinois.  At the time, Deere had no difficulty finding work due to a lack of blacksmiths working in the area. Deere found that cast-iron plows were not working very well in the tough prairie soil of Illinois and remembered the needles he had previously polished by running them through sand as he grew up in his father's tailor shop in Rutland. Deere came to the conclusion that a plow made out of highly polished steel and a correctly shaped moldboard (the self-scouring steel plow) would be better able to handle the soil conditions of the prairie, especially its sticky clay.

Varying versions serve as the inspiration for Deere's famous steel plow. In one version, he recalled the way the polished steel pitchfork tines moved through hay and soil and thought that same effect could be obtained for a plow. Another version is that he used an old sawblade that had been polished from years of use.

In 1827, Deere developed and manufactured the first commercially successful cast-steel plow. The wrought-iron framed plow had a polished steel share.  This made it ideal for the tough soil of the Midwest and worked better than other plows. By early 1838, Deere completed his first steel plow and sold it to a local farmer, Lewis Crandall, who quickly spread word of his success with Deere's plow. Subsequently, two neighbors soon placed orders with Deere. By 1841, Deere was manufacturing 75–100 plows per year.

In 1843, Deere partnered with Leonard Andrus to produce more plows to keep up with demand, but the partnership became strained due to the two men's stubbornness. While Deere wished to sell to customers outside Grand Detour, Andrus opposed a proposed railroad through Grand Detour – and Deere's distrust of Andrus' accounting practices. In 1848, Deere dissolved the partnership with Andrus and moved to Moline, Illinois, because the city was a transportation hub on the Mississippi River.  By 1855, Deere's factory sold more than 10,000 such plows.  It became known as "The Plow that Broke the Plains" and is commemorated as such in a historic place marker in Vermont.

Deere insisted on making high-quality equipment. He once said, "I will never put my name on a product that does not have in it the best that is in me." Following the Panic of 1857, as business improved, Deere left the day-to-day operations to his son Charles. In 1868, Deere incorporated his business as Deere & Company.

Later life

Later in life, Deere focused most of his attention on civil and political affairs. He served as president of the National Bank of Moline, as a director of the Moline Free Public Library, and was a trustee of the First Congregational Church. Deere also served as Moline's mayor for two years but due to chest pains and dysentery Deere refused to run for a second term. He died at home (known as Red Cliff) on May 17, 1886, at the age of 82.

References

Further reading
 Wayne G. Broehl, Jr. John Deere's Company (1984)
 Neil Dahlstrom and Jeremy Dahlstrom. The John Deere Story: A Biography of Plowmakers John and Charles Deere (Northern Illinois University Press, 2005). 204 pp.
 Leslie J. Stegh. "Deere, John"; American National Biography Online (Feb. 2000) (subscription required) 
 

John Deere
1804 births
1886 deaths
American blacksmiths
American chief executives of manufacturing companies
Middlebury College alumni
People from Middlebury, Vermont
People from Moline, Illinois
19th-century American inventors
People from Rutland (town), Vermont
Businesspeople from Illinois
Mayors of places in Illinois
19th-century American businesspeople